Éric Tibusch (born January 6, 1972) is a French artistic director, couturier and fashion designer. Tibusch was raised in Bonifacio, Corsica. He spent his childhood between Corsica and Tahiti prior to his education in France.

Career 

Having always been attracted by the world of fashion, Eric Tibusch reached Paris at 18 years old, where he learned and worked in fashion. Recognizing the talent of the young man, Jean Paul Gaultier took responsibility for his shows abroad. With eight years alongside a major current master of haute couture, he continue to develop and refine his knowledge. When he left the house Jean-Paul Gaultier, he was offered the leadership of a new development program for Kopenhagen Fur Company in 2005, during which he collaborated with houses such as Karl Lagerfeld and John Galliano among others.

Tibusch eventually opened his own house of couture in July 2006; the name of his first collection was "happiness", a tribute to his two heritages: Tahitian and French. Convinced that there is a modern and affordable fashion, he called it "young couture", dedicating his art to the use of materials that are both luxurious and technological. An unconventional and visionary creator, he created in 2010 a chocolate dress for the Chocolate Fashion show in Paris and New York. The same year, he was commissioned to create the costumes of the characters Jake and Neytiri from James Cameron, Avatar for the global launch of the DVD and Blu-ray at the Virgin Megastore in Paris.

He dusted off the catwalks around the world by organizing presentations collection. In October 2012, he launched his first ready to wear women collection. It participates in international events such as the Festival of Cannes and Marrakech and works closely with film artists and music. Today the designer diversifying its activities by extending its creativity ready to wear, to men's fashion and jewelry.

From January 2012, he officiated as artistic adviser to the Clio Blue House, with which it has signed an exclusive license for its jewelry line "Eric Tibusch for Clio Blue", a line of high-end jewelry for the women and men. Beyond the chic and classic emblems brand Clio Blue, Eric Tibusch brings a contemporary vision of magical. In 2013, during his couture winter 2013/2014 for the occasion he joined the French Offshore brand and high-end designer Marc Cotelle chairs, with which it has created an exclusive line of models of chairs and armchairs.

In July 2013, it has presented its 15th couture collection at Pierre Cardin space for this couture autumn–winter 2013–2014, the designer Claude Montana participated in the collection by designing three models. A collection welcomed and acclaimed by the French and international press.

Partnerships 
Since 2007, Tibusch has collaborated regularly with Make Up For Ever in several advertisement campaigns and at his own fashion shows. In 2010, he created an outfit made of chocolate for the "Chocolate Show" in Paris and New York. In the same year, he was in charge of creating Jake and Neytiri costumes for the worldwide launch of both the DVD and Blu-ray versions of the movie Avatar directed by James Cameron.

Since January 2012, he has officiated as artistic adviser to the Clio Blue House, with which it has signed an exclusive license for its jewelry line "Eric Tibusch for Clio Blue", a line of high-end jewelry for the women and men. Beyond the chic and classic emblems brand Clio Blue, Eric Tibusch brings a contemporary vision of magical. He launched for the first time a shoe collection drawn by himself and made by Nando Muzi the Italian shoemaker. In 2013, during his couture winter 2013/2014 for the occasion he joined the French brand of watches Offshore and high-end chair designer Marc Cotelle, with which it has created an exclusive line of models of chairs and armchairs.

Participations 
Eric Tibusch participates in several international events, such as the fashion weeks of Busan in Korea, Tunis in Tunisia, and the International Film Festival of Marrakech. In 2011, Tibusch took part at the 64th Cannes Festival, dressing actresses for their red carpet appearances and charity events, including Michelle Rodriguez, Mallika Sherawat, Ariane Brodier and Juliette Lamboley. For the 51st edition of the Monte-Carlo Television Festival, Tibusch dressed the actress and singer Laure Pester, also known as Lorie, for her first red carpet appearance. He also working with Laure Pester on her new album Regarde moi (Sony Music), as well as with the French singer Shy'm for her new album cover.  Tibusch presented his collection during the 2011 Exposition of "Dar Maalma", in Casablanca (Morocco), to intervene on behalf of the Moroccan artisan women.

In 2013, Eric Tibush dressed the Miss France, Marine Lorphelin, accompanied by the French actor Alain Delon for the closing ceremony of the 66th International Cannes Film Festival. The couture house Eric Tibusch also dressed the French actor Karim Saidi and his wife Siham Noumile, during the red carpet, where the Palme d'Or was won by Abdellatif Kechiche for his feature film La vie d'Adèle, in which the French actor has a role.

The French actresses Aurélia Khazan who was present as a "jeune actrice – jeune  talent" represented in the gallery of portraits throughout the festival, and Aurore Tome former "meneuse de revue" converted into a young actress have both walked into the red carpet dressed in Eric Tibusch.

Eric Tibusch couture collections 

 Fall / Winter 2006/2007 "Happiness", on July 6, 2006
 Spring / Summer, 2007 " Parisian ladies answer present ", on January 23, 2006
 Fall / Winter 2007/2008 "A Murder along the Champs-Elysées ", on July 5, 2007
 Spring / Summer, 2008 "zero-tic", on January 24, 2008
 Fall / Winter 2008/2009 "anti-chambre", on July 2, 2008
 Spring / Summer, 2009 " Bonnie and Clyde ", on January 27, 2009
 Fall / Winter 2009/2010 "Evolution", on July 7, 2009
 "Orbital" Spring / Summer, 2010, on January 26, 2010
 Fall  / Winter 2010/2011 "Legend", on July 6, 2010
 Spring / Summer, 2011 "Android", on January 25, 2011
 Fall / Winter 2011/2012 "no Title", on July 4, 2011
 Spring / Summer, 2012, "chic" on January 23, 2012
 Fall / Winter 2012-2013 " If Paris was telling me ", on July 2, 2012
 Spring / Summer, 2013, on January 26, 2013
 Fall / Winter 2013/2014 "Paris, I love you", on July 1, 2013

References 

NY Times, retrieved 16th Sept 2011

http://nowfashion.com/01-07-2013-eric-tibusch-couture-fall-winter-2013-paris-show-3989.html

http://fashiontographer.com/eric-tibusch-ss13-c/

http://www.meltyfashion.fr/miss-france-2013-marine-lorphelin-au-festival-de-cannes-2013-avec-alain-delon-a182091.html

http://www.20minutes.fr/mode/1183077-20130702-fashion-week-retour-claude-montana-defile-eric-tibusch

http://www.luxurytrends.fr/la-chaise-couture-en-association-avec-le-couturier-eric-tibusch-7578

http://www.trucdenana.com/mode/article/node/focus-sur-le-createur-eric-tibusch,44905,0.html

External links 
Eric Tibusch Official Website

Living people
1972 births
People from Corse-du-Sud
French fashion designers
Artistic directors